Trine Skovgaard Nielsen (born 16 October 1980) is a former Danish team handball player, Olympic champion and recently sports commentator for TV 2 Denmark. She won a gold medal with the Danish national team at the 2004 Summer Olympics in Athens.

Jensen has been sports commentator for the television channel TV 2 Denmark since 2011, covering handball events as expert.

She is a sister of the former Danish handball player and acting handball coach, Jesper Jensen.

References

External links

1980 births
Living people
Danish female handball players
Olympic gold medalists for Denmark
Handball players at the 2004 Summer Olympics
Olympic medalists in handball
Medalists at the 2004 Summer Olympics
Sportspeople from Aalborg
Olympic handball players of Denmark